James Bermingham was Bishop of Killala from 1344 to 1346.

References

1346 deaths
14th-century Roman Catholic bishops in Ireland
Medieval Gaels from Ireland
Bishops of Killala
Year of birth unknown